When life gives you lemons, make lemonade is a proverbial phrase used to encourage optimism and a positive can-do attitude in the face of adversity or misfortune. Lemons suggest sourness or difficulty in life; making lemonade is turning them into something positive or desirable.

Origins
The phrase was coined by Christian anarchist writer Elbert Hubbard in a 1915 obituary he penned and published for dwarf actor Marshall Pinckney Wilder. The obituary, entitled The King of Jesters, praises Wilder's optimistic attitude and achievements in the face of his disabilities:
"He was a walking refutation of that dogmatic statement, Mens sana in corpore sano. His was a sound mind in an unsound body. He proved the eternal paradox of things. He cashed in on his disabilities. He picked up the lemons that Fate had sent him and started a lemonade-stand."
Although the expression was coined by Hubbard, many modern authors attribute the expression to Dale Carnegie who used it in his 1948 book How to Stop Worrying and Start Living. Carnegie's version reads:
"If You Have a Lemon, Make a Lemonade."
Carnegie credited Julius Rosenwald for giving him the phrase.

Variations
The September 1916 edition of the Auburn Seminary Record was the first to publish the phrase following its initial coinage:
"[Hugh K. Walker] described a pessimist as one who fletcherizes his bitter pill, the optimist as the man who made lemonade of the lemon handed him."

Eight years before Carnegie's book brought the phrase back into the mainstream, a poetic rendition of the phrase entitled The Optimist appeared in a 1940 edition of The Rotarian:
"Life handed him a lemon,
As Life sometimes will do.
His friends looked on in pity,
Assuming he was through.
They came upon him later,
Reclining in the shade
In calm contentment, drinking
A glass of lemonade."
In 1944, during Homer E. Capehart's first run for Senate, he became known for saying:
"I have never been afraid of trouble. I have always had this slogan: If somebody hands you a lemon, make lemonade of it."

In popular culture

Warren Hinckle's 1974 autobiography detailing his time as chief editor of Ramparts is called If You Have a Lemon, Make Lemonade.

The initial opening theme for Mystery Science Theater 3000 included the lyric "Joel says when you got lemons, you make lemonade." This was changed when the show was broadcast nationally.

In The Amazing World of Gumball episode "The Curse", there is a song named "When Life Hands You Lemons", which is an obvious nod to the popular sentence.

The saying has become a popular calque in Hispanic culture.

In Portal 2, one of the supporting characters, Cave Johnson, gives a speech through a recorded message where he contests whether one should make lemonade when life gives one lemons.

A commercial for Super Bowl LV advertising Bud Light Seltzer Lemonade mentions 2020 being a "lemon of a years" (a reference to the COVID-19 pandemic) showing lemons literally falling from the sky. Someone was about to say the saying phrase but someone else cuts him off by saying they already knew it.

See also
 List of lemonade topics

References

English proverbs
Lemonade
Metaphors referring to food and drink
Adages
1910s neologisms